Kwak Si-yang (born Kwak Myeong-jin; January 15, 1987) is a South Korean actor.

Career
Kwak debuted as an actor in the 2014 drama Glorious Day. His first major role was the film 2014 Night Flight. He then appeared in the music drama, Persevere, Goo Hae-ra.

On October 1, 2015, Starhaus Entertainment launched the project group One O One, releasing their debut single "Love You". The group consists of Kwak along with fellow Starhaus actors Ahn Hyo-seop, Song Won-seok and Kwon Do-kyun.

Kwak gained popularity after starring in the hit romantic comedy drama Oh My Ghost, portraying a chef who appears stand-offish but is kind and sweet. He then starred in daily drama  , and joined the reality show We Got Married where he was paired with actress Kim So-yeon.

In 2016, Kwak starred in his first historical drama Mirror of the Witch. He received his first major role in SBS's 2016 drama Second to Last Love, which won him the New Star Award at SBS Drama Awards.

In 2017, he starred in tvN's fantasy-romance drama Chicago Typewriter as Yoo Ah-in's rival. He also made a special appearance in KBS' romantic comedy drama Fight for My Way.

In 2018, Kwak appeared in the thriller film The Witness, and also in the romance thriller drama Four Men, a prequel to the 2017's Man to Man.

In 2019, Kwak starred in the war film The Battle of Jangsari. In 2020, he joined the SBS sci-fi drama Alice as time traveler Yu Min-hyuk.

In 2021, Kwak starred in the SBS historical-fantasy drama Lovers of the Red Sky. The same year he joined the JTBC drama Idol: The Coup. Later in September 2021, Kwak signed a contract with Drawing Entertainment after his contract with the previous agency has ended.

In 2022, he played the role of barista Gong Soo-cheol in the KBS2 drama Café Minamdang.

Filmography

Film

Television series

Web series

Television  show

Discography

Soundtrack contributions

Awards and nominations

References

External links

 
 

1987 births
Living people
Male actors from Seoul
South Korean male film actors
South Korean male television actors
South Korean television personalities
21st-century South Korean male actors